Borden v. United States, 593 U.S. ___ (2021), was a United States Supreme Court case involving the classification of prior convictions for "violent felony" in application of Armed Career Criminal Act (ACCA); the ACCA provides for enhanced sentencing for convicted criminals with three or more such felonies in their history. In a 5–4 decision in June 2021, the Supreme Court ruled that crimes resulting from reckless conduct should not be considered as a "violent felony" for the purposes of the ACCA.

Background
The Armed Career Criminal Act (ACCA) passed in 1984 is a federal law that enabled law enforcement to seek enhanced sentences for convicted criminals that have three or more violent felonies or serious drug offensives on their record. Past case law involving the ACCA has led to questions of what constitutes a violent felony to qualify under the ACCA.

Charles Borden Jr. was pulled over in a traffic stop in Tennessee in April 2017 and discovered to have a firearm in his vehicle. As he had a prior felony conviction on his record, he was charged with unlawful possession, which he pled guilty. Upon further evaluation of his record, the state found a prior conviction for reckless aggravated assault, along with two other violent felonies, and charged Borden under the ACCA, receiving a sentence of nine years and seven months.

Borden appealed his conviction to the United States District Court for the Eastern District of Tennessee, arguing that his reckless aggravated assault conviction should not be considered a violent crime under the ACCA and sought a reduced sentence. The District Court denied the appeal, ruling that the aggravated assault was a violent felony. The Sixth Circuit upheld the District Court's decision.

Supreme Court
Borden petitioned the Supreme Court, asking whether a criminal act with a mens rea of recklessness should be considered as a violent felony under the ACCA. The Court granted certiorari for the case in March 2020. Oral argument was held on November 3, 2020.

The Court issued its opinion on June 10, 2021. In a 5–4 vote, the Court reversed the Sixth Circuit's decision and remanded the case for review. The plurality decision was written by Justice Elena Kagan and joined by Justices Stephen Breyer, Sonia Sotomayor, and Neil Gorsuch. Kagan wrote that crimes involving the mens rea of recklessness should not be categorized as "violent felonies" for purposes of the ACCA. Justice Clarence Thomas wrote a concurrence, joining only in the judgment of the case.

A dissenting opinion was written by Justice Brett Kavanaugh, and joined by Chief Justice John Roberts and Justices Samuel Alito and Amy Coney Barrett.

References

External links 
 

2021 in United States case law
United States Supreme Court cases
United States Supreme Court cases of the Roberts Court
Armed Career Criminal Act case law